Venabygd Church is a parish church of the Church of Norway in Ringebu Municipality in Innlandet county, Norway. It is located in the village of Venabygd. It is the church for the Venabygd parish which is part of the Sør-Gudbrandsdal prosti (deanery) in the Diocese of Hamar. The white, wooden church was built in a cruciform design in 1780 using plans drawn up by an unknown architect. The church seats about 170 people.

History
The first church in Venabygd was probably a wooden stave church what was possibly built in the 13th century (a baptismal font in the current church dates back to this era). There is very little that is known about that church. Historical records allude to the fact that around the year 1580, the church was rebuilt and enlarged by adding two transepts on either side of the nave to create a cruciform design. In 1630, a new floor was laid in the church. In 1686, there was a roof leak that was repaired and church records state that the leak was where the old and new parts of the church were joined (alluding to the fact that the old stave church was enlarged). In 1702, the old church was torn down and a new church was built to replace it. The new church was consecrated on 17 March 1703 by the Bishop Hans Munch. The records do not explain why the current church replaced the old one in 1780, less than a century after it was construction. The new church was built as a cruciform building.

Media gallery

See also
List of churches in Hamar

References

Ringebu
Churches in Sør-Gudbrandsdal Deanery
Churches in Innlandet
Cruciform churches in Norway
Wooden churches in Norway
18th-century Church of Norway church buildings
Churches completed in 1780
13th-century establishments in Norway